Photo Finish Records is an American independent record label founded in 2006 in New York City by Matt Galle, listed as one of Billboard’s “40 Under 40” in 2013 and 2015 as well as named a 2020 Billboard Indie Power Player and cited twice on Billboard’s Power List. The label was first distributed by Atlantic Records, then Universal Music Group. Virgin Music Label & Artist Services is its current distributor.

History

Atlantic Records (2006–12)
In 2006, Photo Finish and Matt Galle signed a joint venture deal with Atlantic Records. Their first release was the debut self-titled five-song EP from the New-York-based post-hardcore band Envy on the Coast, followed by the debut EP and studio album from Washington-based rock band Danger Radio.

The label garnered major success with the debut album from the Colorado-based duo 3OH!3, WANT, which peaked at number 44 on the Billboard Top 200 Chart, while their song "Don't Trust Me" went to #1 on the Top 40 Charts, eventually selling over 3 million digital copies.

In August 2008, Photo Finish released the debut album by Anthony Green, Avalon, which debuted at number 44 on the Billboard charts, the label's most successful first-week performance for a release. In 2010, the Virginia-based band The Downtown Fiction’s song I Just Wanna Run played on the season premiere of The Jersey Shore; the track ultimately went Gold.

Universal Music Group (2012–15)
In 2012, Galle brought the label to Island Def Jam and Republic Records, distributed by Universal Music Group.

In October of that year, Photo Finish released the EP Love’s Not Dead by The Mowgli's. The accompanying single “San Francisco” became iTunes’ Single of the Week, peaking at #12 on the Alternative Music Chart and #3 on the AAA Radio Chart. Subsequent releases included their debut album Waiting for the Dawn in 2013 and the follow up Kids in Love in 2014.

2014 also saw the release of Reflections, the debut EP of the New-York-City based band MisterWives, the title song of which became iTunes’ Single of the Week in January and peaked at #13 on the Billboard rock chart, ultimately going Gold in the U.S. and selling 2 million (equivalents), followed by the band’s debut album Our Own House in 2015. That year, MisterWives was chosen as an MTV “Artist to Watch.”

After being chosen for an Apple AirPods commercial, the song “Down” by Marian Hill went Platinum and sold nearly six million track equivalents worldwide, reaching #10 on the Top 40, #13 at Rhythmic, #15 at Alternative, and #17 on Hot AC Radio, while at the same time becoming the most-Shazam’d song in the U.S., according to Rolling Stone magazine.

Caroline Distribution/Virgin Music Label & Artist Services (2016–)
In 2016, Photo Finish made a distribution deal with Caroline Distribution, establishing the label as an independent entity to work with artists including SHAED, ROZES, guardin, Joan, Handsome Ghost, and Lakeview.

In September 2016, Photo Finish released Just Wanna See, the debut EP by SHAED, whose single "Name On It" was the featured track for a Victoria's Secret commercial. SHAED’s single "Trampoline", from their follow-up EP Melt, was featured in a MacBook Air commercial in October, 2018, and was the #1 song on Alternative Radio for the entire year of 2019, garnering over 3 billion in US radio audience and over 7 million worldwide sales (equivalents). The song reached number one on the US Billboard Alternative Songs chart and went double platinum in the United States, Canada, and India.

In 2017, Photo Finish released the debut EP by ROZES. ROZES’s song "Halfway There" was the official anthem to the 2019 Women's March on NYC via The Women's March Alliance.

Artists

Current artists
 Handsome Ghost
 SHAED
 Rozes
 Culpriit
 Mckenna Grace
 guardin
 93feetofsmoke
 Elliot Lee
 Lakeview
 joan
 3OH!3
 The Maine
 MisterWives

Former artists
 Brick + Mortar
 Clinton Sparks
 Danger Radio
 The Downtown Fiction
 Envy on the Coast
 Fighting with Wire
 Hit the Lights
 I Fight Dragons
 Marian Hill
 The Mowgli's
 New Medicine
 Paper Rival
 Rival Schools
 The Strypes

Discography

Studio albums / EP's 
2021 PAW Patrol: The Movie (Music from The Motion Picture)
 Artist: Various Artists
 Released: August 1, 2021
 Genre: Pop-Punk, Alternative Rock, Pop, Post-Grunge, Emo, Indie

2018 MELT EP

 Artist: SHAED
 Released: September 21, 2018 
 Genre: Indie

2018 I Don't Know Where I'm Going, But I'm On My Way EP

 Artist: ROZES
 Released: August 24, 2018 
 Genre: POP

2018 AUTOP$Y EP

 Artist: L.I.F.T 
 Released: June 8, 2018 
 Genre: Alternative

2018 Welcome Back 
 Artist: Handsome Ghost
 Released: February 9, 2018 
 Genre: Indie

2017 Connect The Dots
 Artist: MISTERWIVES
 Released: Spring 2017
 Genre: Alternative
2016
The Brilliant Glow
 Artist: Handsome Ghost
 Released: Fall 2016
 Genre: Alternative

2016
Where'd Your Weekend Go?
 Artist: The Mowgli's
 Released: Fall 2016
 Genre: Alternative

2016
Just Wanna See EP
 Artist: SHAED
 Released: Fall 2016 
 Genre: Alternative

2015 
Kids in Love
 Artist: The Mowgli's 
 Released: Spring 2015 
 Genre: Alternative

2015 
Our Own House
 Artist: MisterWives
 Released: Spring 2015 
 Genre: Alternative

2013
Snapshot
 Artist: The Strypes
 Released: Sept 9, 2013
 Genre: Alternative

2013
Waiting for The Dawn
 Artist: The Mowgli's
 Released: Winter 2013
 Genre: Alternative

2013
Omens
 Artist: 3OH!3
 Released: June 18, 2013
 Genre: Alternative

2012
Beautiful Things
 Artist: Anthony Green
 Released: January 13, 2012
 Genre: Alternative

2011
Let's Be Animals
 Artist: The Downtown Fiction
 Released: Spring 2011
 Genre: Pop punk

Studio albums

Singles

References

External links
 

American independent record labels
Record labels established in 2006